An All-American Toothache is a 1936 American comedy short released by Metro-Goldwyn-Mayer, produced by Hal Roach and directed by Gus Meins, and starring Thelma Todd and Patsy Kelly. It is the 21st and last entry in the Todd and Kelly series.

Cast
Thelma Todd as Thelma Alice Todd
Patsy Kelly as Patricia Veronica Kelly
Mickey Daniels as Elmer
Duke York as Coach Bill
Johnny Arthur as The Dental Professor
Bud Jamison as 2nd Plumber
Billy Bletcher as 1st Plumber
Si Jenks as Janitor

Synopsis
Thelma creates a fake toothache for Patsy whose coveted tooth might help Elmira win the big game.

References

External links 
 An All-American Toothache at the Internet Movie Database

American comedy short films
1936 comedy films
1936 short films
1930s American films
1930s English-language films